Joseph Leaney (born 11 January 1852, date of death unknown) was an English cricket umpire. He stood in one Test match, South Africa vs. England, in 1892. His brother, Edwin, played first-class cricket for Kent County Cricket Club in 1892.

See also
 List of Test cricket umpires

References

1852 births
Year of death missing
Place of birth missing
English Test cricket umpires